Studwell Bennett (January 1796 – 1868) was an English cricketer who was associated with Middlesex and made his first-class debut in 1830.

References

1796 births
1868 deaths
English cricketers
English cricketers of 1826 to 1863
Middlesex cricketers
The Bs cricketers